Jain is the title and name given to an adherent of Jainism. The term has its origin in the Sanskrit term jina ("conqueror" or "victor"). This article lists prominent individuals who have self-identified as a follower of Jainism.

Ascetics

 Rajneesh - Acharya Rajneesh or Chandra Mohan Jain commonly Known as "OSHO"
 Shrimad Rajchandra – Jain saint, scholar and poet
 Bhadrabahu – last  (knower of all Jain Agamas) and spiritual teacher of Emperor Chandragupta
 Kumudendu Muni – author of Siribhoovalaya
 Kundakunda – Jain scholar monk, 2nd century CE, composer of spirituals such as Samayasara, Niyamasara, Pancastikayasara, Pravacanasara, Atthapahuda and Barasanuvekkha
 Pujyapada- Acharya Pujyapada (philosopher monk)
 Siddhasena Divakara – Jain monk and author of Sanmatitarka Prakarana
 Virasena – 9th-century mathematician
 Hiravijaya – influential Jain monk, title 'jagatguru' (influenced mughal Emperor Akbar)
 Yashovijay- "Nyayvisharad", "Nyayacharya" influenced masses through writings, mastery on logics 17th century Jain Sadhu
 Kanji Swami - Known as Koh-i-Noor of Kathiawar, prominent Digamber teacher.
 Acharya Anand Rishiji – Rashtra Sant & Acharya of Shwetambar Sthānakavāsī Jain Shraman Sangh
 Acharya Shri Mahapragya – 10th Acharya of Terapanth sect
 Acharya Shantisagar – 20th century Digambara Acharya
 Sushil Kumar – 20th-century Acharya and yogi; spread Jainism outside India
 Jinendra Varni—Author of Jainendra Siddhanta Kosha and Saman Suttam compilation
 Prabhācandra—11th century CE Digambara monk

Business leaders

 Gautam Adani – Chairman and founder of Adani Group
 Ashwin Choksi & Ashwin Dani – Partners of Asian Paints
 Seth Hukumchand – Cotton King of India.
 Shantidas Jhaveri – businessman during Mughal Era
 Bhavarlal Jain – Chairman of Jain Irrigation Systems Ltd. 
 Vineet Jain & Samir Jain– Chairman of The Times of India group
 Karpoor Chandra Kulish – Founder of Rajasthan Patrika
 Kasturbhai Lalbhai – founders of Arvind (company) & Atul (company)(1931)
 Mangal Lodha – owner of Lodha Group, Mumbai
 Sudhir Mehta & Samir Mehta – Chairman of Torrent Group
 Balvant Parekh- founder of Pidilite Industries (Fevicol)
 Madhukar Parekh – Chairman and CEO of Pidilite Industries
 Thakkar Pheru – Treasurer of Alauddin Khalji
 Raja Harsukh Rai – a builder of several Jain temples in and around Delhi
 Premchand Roychand – founding member of The Bombay Stock Exchange
 Ambalal Sarabhai – Sarabhai group of Companies
 Jagat Seth – India's richest men during Mughals and British Rule
 Dilip Shanghvi – Chairman and founder of Sun Pharmaceuticals
 Sahu Todar – Supervisor of the royal mint at Agra during the rule of Akbar

Indian independence struggle

 Daulat Mal Bhandari – Gandhian, first Member of Parliament from Jaipur, later Chief Justice of Rajasthan High Court
 Ajit Prasad Jain - (1902-1977) Union Minister  UP congress president, Governor of Kerala and four-time member of parliament
 Jagdish Chandra Jain – Indian independence activist 
 Lakshmi Chand Jain – Independence activist
 Mool Chand Jain – often referred to as "Gandhi of Haryana"
 Lala Lajpat Rai – Indian independence activist
 Ambalal Sarabhai – Indian independence activist 
 Mridula Sarabhai – Indian independence activist

Constitutional Office-Holders
 Rajendra Mal Lodha - 41st Chief Justice of India
 Karam Chand Jain - first Legal Advisor of the War & Supply Department of India and Special Police Establishment (SPE), which later developed into the Central Bureau of Investigation (CBI).

Political leaders

Monarchs

 Amoghavarsha – Rashtrakuta Emperor (Karnataka), India
 Veera Ballala – Hoysala king from Malenadu Karnataka, India
 Bhamashah – adviser of Maharana Pratap hero of Mewar (Rajasthan).
 Bhoja II - Shilahara King
 Chavundaraya - General of Ganga dynasty ruler Marsinha who built the Gomateshwara, Shravanabelagola, Karnataka, India
 Abbakka Chowta – Queen of Ullal
 Durvinita – Western Ganga king (Western Ganga Dynasty), Karnataka, India
 Kharavela – Kalinga Emperor (Kalinga is today known as Orissa)
 Kumarapala – Solanki King
 Mahendravarman I - Pallava Emperor
 Dhana Nanda - Nanda dynasty ruler 
 Samprati – Mauryan Emperor

Politicians

Sunder Singh Bhandari – politician from Rajasthan
Dharamchand Chordia - politician from Maharashtra
Dilipkumar Gandhi – politician from Maharasthra
Mishrilal Gangwal –  politician from Madhya Pradesh 
Abhayachandra Jain – politician from Karnataka
Milap Chand Jain- politician from Rajasthan
Nirmal Chandra Jain- politician from Madhya pradesh
Suresh Jain - politician from Jalgaon, Maharashtra
Virdhi Chand Jain – politician from Rajasthan
M. P. Veerendra Kumar-politician from Kerala
V. Dhananjaya Kumar – politician from Karnataka
Dhulappa Bhaurao Navale – politician from Maharashtra 
Gyanchand Parakh - politician from Rajasthan
Sunder Lal Patwa –  politician from Madhya Pradesh
A. Rajendran – politician from Tamil Nadu
Om Prakash Sakhlecha - politician from Madhya Pradesh
Virendra Kumar Sakhlecha – politician from Madhya Pradesh
Prakash Chandra Sethi - politician from Madhya Pradesh
Amit Shah –  politician from Gujarat 
L. M. Singhvi – politician from Rajasthan
Mohan Lal Sukhadia –  politician from Rajasthan 
Harsh Sanghavi –  politician from Gujarat 
Vijay Rupani –  politician from Gujarat

Entertainment

 Tarachand Barjatya – producer
 Sanjay Leela Bhansali - Director and Producer
 Ashok Kumar Jain – host
 Chandulal Jain – producer
 Madan Jain – actor
 Nivedita Jain – Kannada film actress
 Ravindra Jain – music director
 Taarak Mehta - writer
 Babla Virji Shah – music performer, singer
 Kalyanji Virji Shah, music director
 Kiran Shah- actor
 V. Shantaram – filmmaker, film producer and actor

Sports

 Phadeppa Dareppa Chaugule – marathon runner

Authors

 Ilango Adigal (Jain monk)
 Banarasidas – poet, spiritualist and thinker; composed the Banarasivilasa, Nataka Samayasara and his magnum opus, Ardhakathanaka, the first autobiography in Hindi literature
 Virchand Gandhi – represented Jainism in parliament of world religions held at Chicago in 1893, delivered 535 speeches in USA and Europe, and initiated education of Indian women in USA under banner of SEWI
 Bhagchandra Jain – scholar of Jainism, Buddhism and ancient languages.; recipient of the President's (Rastrapati) Award; has written over 40 books and published more than 300 research papers
 Champat Rai Jain – influential Jain writer and apologist of the 20th century
 Padmanabh Jaini – author, Professor Emeritus Berkeley University
 Janna – earliest Kannada poet and contributor to Kannada literature
 Jainendra Kumar
Taarak Mehta – columnist, humourist and writer
 Adikavi Pampa – earliest Kannada literature
 Bal Patil – author, journalist, Jain activist and ex-member of Minority Commission, Government of Maharashtra
 Nathuram Premi – publisher and scholar of Jainism, founder of Hindi Granth Karyalay and Manikchandra Jain Granthamala, historian, researcher, social reformer and editor of Jain Mitra and Jain Hitaishi'
 Kanhaiyalal Sethia
 Shivakotiacharya - 9th-10th century writer, is considered the author of didactic Kannada language Jain text Vaddaradhane''

Other

 Chandraswami
 Chitrabhanu – scholar
 Jyotindra Jain – art and cultural historian, museologist
 Harshad Mehta - stockbroker and convicted fraudster
 Jivaraj Papriwal —Installed 100,000 Jain images in the 15th century
 Vastupala – Gujarati Prime Minister under the Vaghela dynasty, Minister of Dholka, launched construction of the Dilwara Temples in Mount Abu

Scientists and mathematicians

Ancient

 Mahāvīrachārya
 Mahendra Sūri
 Yativṛṣabha

Modern

 Sohan Lal Jain
 Vandana Jain
 Vikram Sarabhai, Father of Indian space technology

Social workers

 Sahu Ramesh Chandra Jain
 Sahu Shanti Prasad Jain
 Harakh Chand Nahata

Activists

 Ajit Prasad Jain
 Jagdish Chandra Jain - scholar, indologist, educationist, writer
 Lakshmi Chand Jain – Ramon Magsaysay Award winner
 Dhulappa (Anna) Bhaurao Navale – first individual Satyagrahi of Mahatma Gandhi from Satara District in which Sangli
 Ambalal Sarabhai - Industrialist, philanthropist, institution builder
 Anasuya Sarabhai – pioneer of the women's labour movement in India

Padma Shri awardees

 Mag Raj Jain
 Bhavarlal Jain
 Ravindra Jain
 Yashpal Jain
 Gyan Chand Jain
 Nemi Chandra Jain
 Sunita Jain

Padma Bhushan awardees

 Veerendra Heggade - Dharmadhikari (Administrator) of Dharmasthala Temple, Karnataka, India
 Girilal Jain
 Kasturbhai Lalbhai – industrialist and philanthropist
 Dalsukh Dahyabhai Malvania - scholar, writer and philosopher
 Bhaurao Patil - educationalist, founder of Rayat Shikshan Sanstha
 Laxmi Mall Singhvi - jurist, parliamentarian, scholar, writer and diplomat

Padma Vibhushan awardees

 Veerendra Heggade - for social work and Dharmadhikari (Administrator) of Dharmasthala Temple, Karnataka, India
 Lakshmi Chand Jain -  political activist, writer, member of the Planning Commission and Indian High Commissioner to South Africa
Sunder Lal Patwa -  11th Chief Minister of Madhya Pradesh and a cabinet minister in the Government of India. 
 Vikram Sarabhai - Space scientist who is considered as Father of Indian Space Program

See also
 Jainism
 Jain community

References

 
Lists of people by religion